Makhdum Pur,  is an ancient city in the district of Khanewal, Punjab, Pakistan. This city is situated between Tulamba and Kabirwala. 

The specialty of this city is making bed sheets and wearing cloth of many kinds. This city has 5 main bazars, a railway station, bus station, municipal office, health clinic, police station, and post office. Makhdum Pur is one of the historic places of Province Punjab. Gurdwara Makhdum Pur is a religious place for Hindus. Now this historic building is a part of Govt. Higher Secondary School Makhdum Pur Khaddi, Basmati Rice, Khaddar, Clay pots, embroidery, wood carving and Agronomy are the heritage and symbol of Makhdum Pur.

Demographics
80% of the population speak the Jhangvi dialectRajputi of Punjabi and UrduRanghari. Some people also speak English.

Education
Almost 60% of the younger generation is educated; there are many schools and colleges in Makhdoom Pur

Religion
The population is predominantly Muslim. There are several Mosques in the town. After the independence of Pakistan in 1947, the minority Hindus and Sikhs migrated to India while many Muslims refugees from India settled down in the Makhdoom Pur.

According to legends, Sikh founder Gurunanak visited the Makhdoom Pur and Gurdwara Makhdoom Pur located in the City.
Populated places in Khanewal District